The Eleventh Ward Railroad, a street trolley line in Syracuse, New York, was established in 1889 and held the city railway franchise rights to East Fayette Street. The line followed East Fayette Street to Montgomery Street and from there through Burt, Cortland Avenue, Midland Avenue, Colvin Street, Mulberry, Elizabeth, Baker Avenue and terminating on Kennedy street.

References

Defunct railroads in Syracuse, New York
Defunct New York (state) railroads
Railway companies established in 1889
Railway companies disestablished in 1890
Interurban railways in New York (state)
1889 establishments in New York (state)
1890 disestablishments in New York (state)
American companies established in 1889
American companies disestablished in 1890